The Gordon Payne Site, designated by the Smithsonian trinomial 31MR15, is a prehistoric archaeological site in northern Moore County, North Carolina. Located on a terrace above the Deep River, it is a habitation site whose artifacts have yielded dates of 1060-1100 CE.

The site was listed on the National Register of Historic Places in 1986.

See also
National Register of Historic Places listings in Moore County, North Carolina

References

Archaeological sites on the National Register of Historic Places in North Carolina
Moore County, North Carolina
National Register of Historic Places in Moore County, North Carolina